Baek Soon-Ae is a female former international table tennis player from South Korea.

Table tennis career
She won a silver medal for South Korea at the 1987 World Table Tennis Championships in the Corbillon Cup (women's team event) with Hong Soon-hwa, Hyun Jung-hwa, Yang Young-ja.

She also reached the quarter finals of the mixed doubles during the 1987 World Championships.

See also
 List of World Table Tennis Championships medalists

References

South Korean female table tennis players
World Table Tennis Championships medalists
20th-century South Korean women